Ajit Singh Kohar was an Indian politician and a member of Shiromani Akali Dal. He was the Minister of Transport, Legal & Legislative Affairs and Elections in the  Punjab Government.

Political career
Jathedar Ajit Singh Ji Kohar Sahab was firstly elected to the Punjab Legislative Assembly in 1997 on an Akali Dal ticket from Lohian by defeating Congress candidate Chaudhary Darshan Singh by more than 27160 votes, a huge margin. Jathedar Ajit Singh Ji Kohar Sahab was appointed and held the portfolios of Minister Of Defence Services, Agriculture, Jail in Sardar Parkash Singh Ji Badal Sahab's 3rd Ministry. Jathedar Kohar was re-elected from Lohian in 2002 by defeating former Home Minister Brij Bhupinder Singh Lally Kang by 5144 votes and in 2007 Jathedar Ajit Singh Kohar Sahab successfully contested for a 3rd win from Lohian and defeated Congress candidate Lt. Col. CD Singh Kamboj by 19000 votes, a huge margin. In 2007, he was made Minister for Revenue and Rehabilitation. In 2012, Lohian underwent boundary delimitation. Kohar successfully contested from new constituency Shahkot. Currently he is an ex cabinet minister in Punjab and holding portfolios of Transport, Legal & Legislative Affairs and Elections. In 2017 Punjab Vidhan Sabha elections Jathedar Ajit Singh Kohar successfully contested from Shahkot constituency and won for the 5th time. Shiromani Akali Dal Party President Sardar Sukubir Singh Ji Badal appointed Jathedar Kohar as Deputy Leader of opposition in Punjab Vidhan Sabha. Jathedar Ajit Singh Kohar Sahab also held the responsibility of the President of the Shiromani Akali Dal District Jalandhar (Rural). He was made President from 1987 till 2018 (31) Years. Jathedar Ajit Singh Kohar held the responsibility of the President of the Shiromani Akali Dal Jalandhar (Rural).

References

Shiromani Akali Dal politicians
Punjab, India MLAs 2007–2012
Place of birth missing (living people)
Living people
Indian Sikhs
Year of birth missing (living people)
Punjab, India MLAs 2012–2017
Punjab, India MLAs 1997–2002
Punjab, India MLAs 2002–2007
People from Jalandhar district
Transport ministers
State cabinet ministers of Punjab, India
Punjab, India MLAs 2017–2022